Vojtěch Kubinčák (born February 4, 1979) is a Czech professional ice hockey player currently playing for KLH Chomutov in the Czech Extraliga.

Career 
Kubinčák has played with HC Litvínov in the Czech Extraliga between seasons 1997–98 and 2001–02, and again since the season 2003–04. In the 2002–03 Czech Extraliga season he played with HC Liberec and HC Sparta Praha.
 
After the 2010–11 Czech Extraliga season Kubincak had played a total of 622 Czech Extraliga regular season games during 14 seasons and done a total of 282 regular season points, 131 goals and 151 assists.

Kubinčák has represented Czech Republic men's national ice hockey team in three Euro Hockey Tour games during the season 2006–2007.

References

External links

1979 births
Czech ice hockey forwards
HC Litvínov players
HC Bílí Tygři Liberec players
HC Sparta Praha players
Living people
Sportspeople from Most (city)
HC Most players
BK Mladá Boleslav players
Czech expatriate ice hockey people
Czech expatriate sportspeople in Italy
Expatriate ice hockey players in Italy